Pamela Pepper (born 1964) is an American lawyer and jurist serving as the chief United States district judge of the United States District Court for the Eastern District of Wisconsin and former chief United States bankruptcy judge of the same court.

Education

Pepper received a Bachelor of Science degree in 1986 from Northwestern University. She received a Juris Doctor in 1989 from Cornell Law School.

Career
She began her legal career as a law clerk for Judge Frank M. Johnson Jr. of the United States Court of Appeals for the Eleventh Circuit from 1989 to 1990. She served as an assistant United States attorney in the Northern District of Illinois from 1990 to 1994 and in the Eastern District of Wisconsin from 1994 to 1997. From 1997 to 2005, she worked in private practice as a criminal defense attorney, where she handled both trials and appeals in State and Federal courts. Starting in 2005 until 2009, Pepper concurrently served as a bankruptcy judge in the Eastern District of Wisconsin and Southern District of Illinois. From 2009 to 2014 she served solely in the Eastern District of Wisconsin and from 2010 to 2014 she served as chief United States bankruptcy judge.

Federal judicial service
In 2014, Pepper was one of three finalists recommended to President Barack Obama by the bipartisan Wisconsin Federal Nominating Commission to fill a vacancy on the federal District Court for the Eastern District of Wisconsin. The other finalists were attorney Beth Kushner and state-court judge William Pocan.

On May 1, 2014, Obama nominated Pepper to the seat, which was vacated by Judge Charles N. Clevert Jr., who assumed senior status on October 31, 2012. She received a hearing on her nomination in the Senate Judiciary Committee on June 24, 2014. On July 17, 2014, her nomination was reported out of committee by a voice vote. On November 18, 2014, Senate Majority Leader Harry Reid filed for cloture on her nomination. On November 19, 2014, cloture was invoked by a 58–39 vote. On November 20, 2014, the Senate voted 95–0 to confirm her nomination. She received her judicial commission on December 8, 2014. She became chief judge on November 1, 2019.

References

External links

1964 births
Living people
American women lawyers
Assistant United States Attorneys
Cornell Law School alumni
Illinois lawyers
Judges of the United States bankruptcy courts
Judges of the United States District Court for the Eastern District of Wisconsin
Marquette University alumni
Northwestern University alumni
Lawyers from New Orleans
United States district court judges appointed by Barack Obama
21st-century American judges
Wisconsin lawyers
21st-century American women judges